Hyphessobrycon auca is a species of South American fish in the family Characidae.

Description
H. auca reaches a maximum length of 4.2 cm.
The species is very similar to the Buenos Aires tetra (Hyphessobrycon asitsi), with only subtle differences. It is slightly duller with less red on its fins and patchier black area at the base of the tail.

Distribution and habitat
The species is known only from two localities, individual ponds in wetlands in the Corrientes province of northern Argentina.

References

Characidae
Fish described in 2004